CJYE is a Canadian radio station, broadcasting at 1250 AM in Oakville, Ontario. The station airs a Christian music and talk format branded as Joy Radio. CJYE's studios are located on Church Street in downtown Oakville, while its transmitters are located along Dundas Street West near Third Line Road on the northwest side of Oakville.

CJYE launched on February 5, 2001, adopting the frequency formerly held by its sister station CHWO. Its religious programming formerly aired on sister station CJMR, which also aired multilingual programming. With the launch of CJYE, CJMR moved to a full-time multilingual format.

External links
 Joy Radio
 
 Decision CRTC 2000-205
 

Jye
Jye
Oakville, Ontario
Radio stations established in 2001
2001 establishments in Ontario